The Finnish Society of Sciences and Letters is a Finnish academy for natural sciences, social sciences and humanities. It is known in Latin as Societas Scientiarum Fennica, in Swedish as Finska Vetenskaps-Societeten, and in Finnish as Suomen Tiedeseura. It is a bilingual (Swedish and Finnish) science academy and the oldest of the four science academies in Finland.

The society was founded in 1838 and is based in Helsinki. It has a total of 120 full ordinary Finnish members, excluding members who have reached the age of 67 (a member who reaches the age of 67 retains the rights as a member but leaves his or her chair open for election of a new member), and about 120 foreign members. It is divided into four sections: I: mathematics and physics, II: biosciences, III: humanities, and IV: social sciences.

The society publishes a yearbook, Sphinx, and the book series Commentationes Humanarum Litterarum, Commentationes Scientiarum Socialium, Bidrag till kännedom av Finlands natur och folk and The History of Learning and Science in Finland 1828-1918. It also awards a number of prizes and grants for scientific and scholarly work.

In addition to the Finnish Society of Sciences and Letters, there are three other academies in Finland: the Finnish Academy of Science and Letters and two academies of engineering sciences. The four Finnish academies have an umbrella organisation for cooperation, the Council of Finnish Academies.

References

External links
Societas Scientiarum Fennica, official website
Finnish Society of Sciences and Letters, English presentation
Publications

Science and technology in Finland
Finland
Finland
Learned societies of Finland
1838 establishments in Finland
Scientific organizations established in 1838
19th century in Helsinki